Wilfred T. Ussery (born October 11, 1928) is the former third National Chairman of the Congress of Racial Equality (CORE) in the United States, having served from June 1968 to May 1969.

Ussery also served as the Chairman of the San Francisco CORE. He was also the president of Black Urban Systems, a firm that consulted African Americans on getting control of services, institutions, and resources in their communities.

References

Living people
1928 births